Seacoast United Mariners is an American soccer team based in Brunswick and Topsham, Maine, United States. Founded in 2011, the team made its debut in the Northeast-Atlantic Division of the National Premier Soccer League (NPSL), the fourth tier of the United States soccer league system, in 2012. The team is operated by the Seacoast United Soccer Club, alongside division rivals, the Seacoast United Phantoms.

History
The Mariners began play in the Northeast-Atlantic Division of the National Premier Soccer League in 2012.
Seacoast United Mariners was originally founded in 1986 as Costal Soccer Club with a mission to help kids and young adults play more competitive soccer.

Teams
Seacoast United Mariners has two regions Maine South and Maine North. There are teams that play at the premier and select level and offer U9-U18 boys and girls. In 2018 Seacoast United became a part of the US Soccer Development Academy which is the most competitive league that the club has to offer.

Year-by-year

See also
Seacoast United Phantoms (NPSL)
Seacoast United Phantoms (PDL)

References

Association football clubs established in 2011
National Premier Soccer League teams
2011 establishments in Maine
Scarborough, Maine
Soccer clubs in Maine
Organizations based in Brunswick, Maine